The Potomac Flotilla, also called the Potomac Squadron, was a unit of the United States Navy created in the early days of the American Civil War to secure Union communications in the Chesapeake Bay, the Potomac River and their tributaries, and to disrupt Confederate communications and shipping there.

History

American Civil War

On April 22, 1861 Commander James H. Ward, who was the commanding officer of the receiving ship  at the New York Navy Yard in Brooklyn New York, wrote to United States Secretary of the Navy Gideon Wells to put forth a plan for the protection of the Chesapeake Bay area. Ward suggested a "Flying Flotilla" of light-draft vessels to operate in the Chesapeake Bay, the Potomac River, and their tributaries. His commander, Captain Samuel L. Breese, commandant of the New York Navy Yard, endorsed his plan. Wells accepted this proposal and wrote back to Ward and Breese on 27 April 1861 authorizing them to begin carrying out Ward's plan. On 1 May 1861 the first vessels for the new flotilla were acquired. He arrived at the Washington Navy Yard in Washington, D.C., on 20 May 1861 on board his flagship,Thomas Freeborn.

On 27 June 1861 Ward's flotilla engaged the Confederates at Mathias Point, Virginia. While he was sighting the bow gun of Thomas Freeborn, Ward was shot through the abdomen and died within an hour due to internal hemorrhaging. He was the first United States Navy officer to be killed during the American Civil War.

After the death of Ward the flotilla was led by a succession of short-term commanders until the fall of 1862 when Commodore Andrew A. Harwood took command. He was in turn succeeded by  Commander Foxhall A. Parker on 31 December 1864.

The Civil War ended in April 1865, and on 18 July 1865 the United States Department of the Navy ordered Parker to disband the flotilla, effective 31 July 1865. Most of the flotilla's remaining vessels were sent to the Washington Navy Yard to be decommissioned.

Name of the flotilla
It was not until August 1861 that the flotilla became known as the Potomac Flotilla. The designation of "Flying Flotilla" was dropped when Ward's force arrived in the theater of operations. The flotilla was then referred to by a variety of names, including: Flotilla, Potomac River; Potomac Blockade; Flotilla in the Chesapeake; etc. In early August 1861 the flotilla commander and the Department of the Navy began to consistently refer to the command as the Potomac Flotilla.

Operations
1861
Engagement with the Confederate batteries at Aquia Creek, Virginia, 29 May – 1 June 1861
Affair at Mathias Point, Virginia, 27 June 1861
Engagement with the Confederate batteries at Potomac Creek, Virginia, 23 August 1861
Engagement with the Confederate battery at Freestone Point, Virginia, 25 September 1861

1862
Engagement at Cockpit Point, Virginia, 3 January 1862
Expedition up the Rappahannock River to Tappahannock, Virginia, 13–15 April 1862
Expedition up the Rappahannock River to Fredericksburg, Virginia, 20 April 1862
Expeditions to Gwynn's Island and Nomini Creek, Virginia, 3–4 Nov, 1862
Engagement at Port Royal, Virginia, 4 December 1862
Engagement at Brandywine Hill, Rappahannock River, Virginia, 10–11 December 1862

1863
Destruction of salt works on Dividing Creek, Virginia, 12 January 1863
Destruction of Confederate stores at Tappahannock, Virginia, 30 May 1863
Capture of U. S. steamers  and USRC Reliance, 16 August 1863

1864
Expedition to the Northern Neck of Virginia, 12 January 1864
Expedition up the Rappahannock River, Virginia, 18–21 April 1864
Expedition to Carter's Creek, Virginia, 29 April 1864
Expedition to Mill Creek, Virginia, 12–13 May 1864
Expedition up the Rappahannock River, Virginia, 16–19 May 1864
Expedition to the Northern Neck of Virginia, 11–21 June 1864
Expedition to Milford Haven and Stutt's Creek, Virginia, 24 September 1864

1865
Expedition to Fredericksburg, Virginia, 6–8 March 1865
Expedition up the Rappahannock River, 12–14 March 1865
Operations in Mattox Creek, Virginia, 16–18 March 1865

Ships of the flotilla
When Commander James H. Ward departed the New York Navy Yard on 16 May 1861 his flotilla consisted of three vessels. The size of the flotilla steadily increased until it reached a strength that hovered between 15 and 25 vessels.

Commanders

References
In these notes the abbreviation ORN is used for the work Official Records of the Union and Confederate Navies in the War of the Rebellion.
Notes

Bibliography
 Official Records of the Union and Confederate Navies in the War of the Rebellion, Series I, Volume 4. (Washington, DC: Government Printing Office, 1896).Official Records of the Union and Confederate Navies in the War of the Rebellion, Series I, Volume 5. (Washington, DC: Government Printing Office, 1897).
 Silverstone, Paul H. Warships of the Civil War Navies. (Annapolis, MD: Naval Institute Press, 1989). 
 

 

Union Navy
Ship squadrons of the United States Navy
1861 establishments in the United States